Estonian national bandy team competed for the first time during the first period of Estonian independence, in the interwar years 1918–1940. Estonia played six international friendlies against Finland between 1923 and 1934, losing them all.

Estonia got occupied by the Soviet Union in 1944 and regained its independence in 1991. The modern Estonian Bandy Association was founded in 2001 and joined the Federation of International Bandy in 2002.

The re-established national bandy team participated in the annual Bandy World Championship for the first time in 2003. Estonia won the Davos Cup in 2016 but was disqualified from the 2016 Bandy World Championship.

World Championship record

References

External links
 Team picture

National bandy teams
Bandy
Bandy in Estonia
2001 establishments in Estonia